Shah Najer (also Romanized as Shāh Nājer) is a village in Tavabe-e Kojur Rural District, Kojur District, Nowshahr County, Mazandaran Province, Iran. At the 2006 census, its population was 105, in 33 families.

References 

Populated places in Nowshahr County